Meymand District is a district (bakhsh) in Firuzabad County, Fars Province, Iran. At the 2006 census, its population was 25,765, in 5,948 families.  The District has one city: Meymand. The District has three rural districts (dehestan): Dadenjan Rural District, Khvajehei Rural District, and Par Zeytun Rural District.

References 

Firuzabad County
Districts of Fars Province